Karim Strohmeier-Merino (born 1 November 1969) is a Peruvian former professional tennis player.

A right-handed player, Strohmeier featured in three Federation Cup ties for Peru in 1987, against Brazil, Malta and Norway. She won two ITF singles titles during her career and featured in the qualifying draw for the 1989 US Open.

ITF Circuit finals

Singles: 2 (2–0)

Doubles: 3 (1–2)

References

External links
 
 
 

1969 births
Living people
Peruvian female tennis players
South American Games medalists in tennis
South American Games silver medalists for Peru
South American Games bronze medalists for Peru
Competitors at the 1990 South American Games
20th-century Peruvian women
21st-century Peruvian women